Barry G. Masteller (born April 21, 1945) is an American abstract painter and photographer.

Early life
Masteller was born in 1945 in Los Angeles California and grew up in the Silver Lake district. He began painting as a teen and is mostly self-taught.

Solo exhibitions
2015	Bridges and Echoes. Triton Museum of Art, Santa Clara, California
2013	Along the Way. Hartnell College Art Gallery, Salinas, California
2010	US Embassy, Kathmandu, Nepal
2009	Boulevards. Elenor D. Wilson Museum of Art, Hollins University
2007	Earth + Sky. The Grace Museum, Abilene, Texas
2007	Imagined Journeys. Wiregrass Museum of Art, Dothan, Alabama
2007	Cityscapes. Dubuque Museum of Art, Dubuque, Iowa
2007	Recent Work. Caldwell Snyder Gallery, San Francisco 
2006	Monterey Now. Monterey Museum of Art
2006	Landscapes.  Campton Gallery, New York
2006	Mythical Landscapes. Museum of the Southwest, Midland, Texas
2006	Recent Paintings. Patricia Rovzar Gallery, Seattle, Washington

Collections
 Crocker Art Museum, Sacramento, CA
 California State Senate Contemporary California Art Collection
 San Jose Museum of Art
 Monterey Museum of Art
 Santa Cruz Museum of Art and History
 Triton Museum of Art
 Palm Springs Art Museum

References

External links
 Official website

1945 births
American abstract artists
Artists from Los Angeles
Living people